Depressaria libanotidella is a moth of the family Depressariidae. It is found in most of Europe, except Great Britain, Ireland, the Benelux, Portugal, Norway, Poland, most of the Balkan Peninsula and most of the Baltic region.

The wingspan is 22–29 mm. Adults are on wing in June.

The larvae feed on Seseli libanotis and Laserpitium prutenicum.

References

External links
lepiforum.de

Moths described in 1849
Depressaria
Moths of Europe